Blue Lightning may refer to:

The Blue Lightning, a 1986 Australian film
Blue Lightning (1989 video game), an Atari video game for the Lynx console
Blue Lightning (1995 video game), an Atari video game for the Jaguar console
IBM 486DLC (Blue Lightning), an improved version of the IBM 386SLC
Blue Lightning (Evan K album), 2016
Blue Lightning (Yngwie Malmsteen album), 2019
"Blue Lightning", a 2022 song by Big Thief from the album Dragon New Warm Mountain I Believe in You